Dariusz Stalmach (born 8 December 2005) is a Polish professional footballer who plays as a midfielder for Italian club AC Milan U19.

Club career
In September 2022, he was named by English newspaper The Guardian as one of the best players born in 2005 worldwide.

In August 21, 2022 he moved to Serie A club AC Milan, immediately joining the under-19 roster.

Career statistics

Club

Notes

References

2005 births
Living people
Polish footballers
Association football midfielders
Poland youth international footballers
Ekstraklasa players
III liga players
Rozwój Katowice players
Ruch Radzionków players
Górnik Zabrze players
A.C. Milan players
Polish expatriate footballers
Expatriate footballers in Italy
Polish expatriate sportspeople in Italy